Norwich Stars were a motorcycle speedway team based in Norwich, England which operated from 1930 until their closure in 1964.

History
Speedway racing was staged in Norwich both before and after World War II at The Firs Stadium in Cromer Road, Hellesdon. Pre-War Norwich were members of the 1937 Provincial Speedway League, 1938 Speedway National League Division Two & 1939 Speedway National League Division Two. After the war, the Norwich Stars raced in the 1946 Speedway Northern League and the National League Division Two from 1947 to 1951. They won the League Championship in both 1950 and 1951.

They were invited into the National League Division One in 1952 and finished runners up in the League in 1958 and 1963. Another honour was the winning of Speedway's premier Knockout Competition, the National Trophy. This was achieved in both 1955 and 1963. The Stars raced in the top flight until the stadium was closed at the end of the 1964 season, when the track and stadium were sold for re-development.

In July 2012, former rider Ove Fundin played a part in announcing a return of speedway in the city of Norwich. Plans, which did not come to fruition, were outlined for a new track to be built on the city's outskirts, with the hope of a return to the British league structure.

Season summary

Notable riders
 Ove Fundin
 Trevor Hedge
 Aub Lawson
 Bob Leverenz
 Geoff Pymar
 Raymond "Billy" Bales
 Olle Nygren
 Terry Betts
 Jimmy Gooch
 Max Grosskreutz
 Paddy Mills
 Cyril Roger

Fatalities
Four riders from 1947 to 1951 died at the Norwich track. Norwich's 38-year-old rider Cyril Anderson died instantly on 16 August 1947, during a Best Pairs event. Anderson was leading when he skidded and was hit by a rider from behind. 32-year-old Bill Wilson of the Middlesbrough Bears was fatally injured, on 3 July 1948, at Norwich and died two days later in hospital. 

The third rider died on 1 July 1950. Jock Shead riding for Halifax Dukes was killed during the semi final of the National Trophy. Shead's bike collided with another bike and he somersaulted before landing, he was taken to hospital but died shortly afterwards. The following year, 21-year-old Bob Howes was killed when he hit the fence during a training practice race on 10 November 1951.

Norwich rider Malcolm Flood died on 2 April 1956, at Poole. The 25-year-old rider suffered fatal injuries despite an earlier warning from the race steward that he was riding too erratically into the bends. 

The Firs Stadium was arguably the deadliest track in the country and claimed another life on 24 July 1960. Derek 'Tink' Maynard of the Belle Vue Aces was fatally injured in a crash on 23 July 1960. Maynard was competing in the second leg of the National Trophy against Norwich when Slant Payling lost control of his bike and it hit Maynard. Both riders were taken to Norwich Hospital but Maynard died the following morning.

References 

Defunct British speedway teams
Sport in Norwich